Federico Guillermo Rosso (born 1 July 1987) is an Argentine professional footballer who plays as a centre-back for Chacarita Juniors.

Career
Rosso's career began in 2008 with Primera B Nacional side Chacarita Juniors, however before featuring for the club he was loaned out to Central Córdoba of Torneo Argentino A. Five appearances followed. In August 2010, Rosso was an unused substitute three times for Chacarita in league matches against Tiro Federal, Unión Santa Fe and Gimnasia y Esgrima. 2011 saw him leave Chacarita permanently to join CAI, prior to subsequently moving to Sportivo Desamparados. He made seventeen and twenty-five appearances for those clubs respectively, both seasons ended with relegation.

In July 2012, Rosso left Argentine football to join Brescia of Italy's Serie B. He made his Brescia debut on 25 August, he was subbed on in stoppage time as Brescia lost to Crotone 1–0. He would only make two further appearances in 2012–13, both as a late substitute. Rosso departed Brescia a year after joining in July 2013 after just three appearances, none of which were starts or home games. He returned to Argentina to sign for Crucero del Norte in Primera B Nacional. He went onto make thirty-seven appearances in two seasons with Crucero, twelve came during the club's promotion-winning campaign of 2014.

He made another twelve appearances in the Argentine Primera División with Crucero, but dropped down a division in 2016 to rejoin former club Chacarita Juniors. Forty-nine matches later, Rosso was back in the Primera División after Chacarita were promoted in 2016–17. In the top-flight, Rosso scored three goals in his first ten matches; including two versus Lanús on 11 December 2017. On 30 June 2018, Rosso joined Agropecuario of Primera B Nacional. Ahead of the 2022 season, Rosso returned to his former club, Chacarita Juniors.

Personal life
He is the brother of fellow footballer Matías Rosso.

Career statistics
.

References

External links

1987 births
Living people
Footballers from Rosario, Santa Fe
Argentine footballers
Association football defenders
Argentine expatriate footballers
Expatriate footballers in Italy
Argentine expatriate sportspeople in Italy
Primera Nacional players
Argentine Primera División players
Torneo Argentino A players
Serie B players
Chacarita Juniors footballers
Central Córdoba de Santiago del Estero footballers
Comisión de Actividades Infantiles footballers
Sportivo Desamparados footballers
Brescia Calcio players
Crucero del Norte footballers
Club Agropecuario Argentino players